Princess Christian of Hanover (née Alessandra Lisette de Osma Foy, born 21 March 1988) is a Peruvian attorney, handbag designer, and former model. She is a member of the Hanoverian royal family through her marriage to Prince Christian of Hanover.

Ancestry 
Alessandra de Osma was born in San Borja, Lima, Peru. She is daughter of Felipe Juan Luis de Osma Berckemeyer, Executive and Central Commercial Manager of Hermes Transportes Blindados, a Peruvian cash management firm, and wife Elizabeth María Foy Vásquez, a former model.

Career 
When de Osma was sixteen she signed with Ford Models in New York City. She has modeled for Missoni and Bottega Veneta. She studied law at the University of Lima and has a master's degree in fashion and business management from the University of Navarra. In 2018 she launched her own fashion brand Moi & Sass with Moira Laporta.

Personal life 
De Osma met Prince Christian of Hanover in 2005 when she served as his tour guide when he was vacationing in Peru. They started dating in 2011. The couple became engaged in April 2017. They married in a civil ceremony on 25 November 2017 in London. They married religiously in a Catholic ceremony at the Basilica of San Pedro in Lima, Peru, on 16 March 2018. The groom's younger half-sister, Princess Alexandra, served as her bridesmaid. De Osma wore the Hanover floral tiara, which had previously been worn by Caroline, Princess of Hanover. Wedding guests at the religious ceremony included Princess Beatrice and Princess Eugenie of York, Princess Maria-Olympia of Greece and Denmark, Count Nikolai von Bismarck, and Kate Moss. The wedding celebrations lasted for three days.

The couple lives in Madrid, near the club Puerta de Hierro. Alessandra gave birth to twins on 7 July 2020 at Quirón Clinic in Pozuelo de Alarcón, Madrid.

References 

Living people
Alessandra
Hanoverian princesses by marriage
Peruvian designers
Peruvian female models
Peruvian women lawyers
People from Lima
University of Lima alumni
University of Navarra alumni
Peruvian women fashion designers
21st-century Peruvian lawyers
Peruvian emigrants to Spain
1988 births